Mikel Canka (born 18 February 1987) is an Albanian professional footballer who plays as a striker for KF Besa Kavajë in  the Kategoria e Parë.

Club career
Canka left his hometown club Lushnja following their relegation from the Kategoria Superiore and signed a three-year contract with newly promoted side Apolonia on 10 June 2014.

In 2015, during the winter transfer window, Canka left Apolonia after only half season to rejoin Lushnja until the end of 2014–15 season.

In July 2015, Canka left Lushnja and signed a one-year contract with fellow Kategoria e Parë side Luftëtari. During the 2015–16 season, Canka played 25 league matches, scoring 15 goals, as Luftëtari won the Group B and achieved the promotion to Kategoria Superiore.

In August 2016, Canka returned to Lushnja for a third time, and made his first appearance of the 2016–17 season on 26 September in the opening day against Tomori.  On 18 October he scored a hat-trick, including first goals of the season in Lushnja's 1–4 win at Elbasani. This was followed by a brace in the 2–0 home win against Shkumbini four days later, scoring in the last minutes of the match, taking his tally up to 5 league goals. On 25 February of the following year, Canka scored a cruel goal against Apolonia in an eventual 2–0 away win in the matchday 17, helping Lushnja to win in Fier for the first time in 44 years. After helping the club to return to top flight after three years, Canka confirmed that he would remain in Lushnja for the next season. On 24 July, he extended his contract for another season.

Canka scored his first top flight goal in three years on 26 November 2017 in the 2–1 away defeat to Kamza valid for week 12. Later on 16 December in the league match versus Skënderbeu, after the dismissal of goalkeeper Mikel Spaho and after all three of the club's substitutions were exhausted, Canka was put into goal for the final 7 minutes of the match, conceding a goal when he dropped a free-kick from Marko Radaš.

Career Statistics

Honours

Club
Lushnja
Kategoria e Parë: 2012–13

Luftëtari 
Kategoria e Parë: 2015–16

Individual
Kategoria e Parë Top Goalscorer: 2012–13

Notes

References

External links
 Profile - FSHF
Profile at Football DataBase

1987 births
Living people
Sportspeople from Lushnjë
Association football forwards
Albanian footballers
KS Lushnja players
KF Apolonia Fier players
Luftëtari Gjirokastër players
KS Egnatia Rrogozhinë players
KF Tomori players
KF Besa Kavajë players
Kategoria Superiore players
Kategoria e Parë players